Eva Shirali (born 16 July 1980) is an Indian Hindi actress from Mumbai, best known for her roles in Gujarati and Hindi soap operas. Lastly, she played the role of Garima in the show Divya Drishti and Gayatri Sabherwal in Shaurya Aur Anokhi Ki Kahani on Star Plus. She is currently playing the role of Sudha Sharma, Suhaani's mother in Rashmi Sharma's Sirf Tum on Colors TV.

Television

References

Living people
1980 births
21st-century Indian actresses
Indian film actresses
Indian stage actresses
Indian soap opera actresses
Indian television actresses
Actresses in Hindi television